Irvillac is a commune in the Finistère department and administrative region of Brittany in north-western France.

Population
In French the inhabitants of Irvillac are known as Irvillacois.

See also
Communes of the Finistère department
Jean Joncourt, sculptor, born in Irvillac
Roland Doré sculptor, sculptor of the calvary in Irvillac

References

External links

Official website

Mayors of Finistère Association 

Communes of Finistère